is a Japanese manga series by Haruki. It was adapted into a live-action film in 2011.

Cast
 Rei Yoshii - Suzune
 Megumi Kagurazaka - Naomi

See also
Ero Ninja Scrolls — another manga series created by Haruki

References

External links
  
 

2004 manga
Live-action films based on manga
Films directed by Ryu Kaneda
2010s Japanese-language films
Manga adapted into films
Takeshobo manga
Seinen manga
2010s Japanese films